Top Country Albums is a chart that ranks the top-performing country music albums in the United States, published by Billboard.  In 2017, 30 different albums topped the chart; placings were based on electronic point of sale data from retail outlets through the issue dated February 4; after that Billboard introduced a new methodology based on multi-metric consumption, blending traditional album sales, track equivalent albums, and streaming equivalent albums.

In the issue of Billboard dated January 7, Garth Brooks was at number one with the box set The Ultimate Collection, its second week in the top spot.  Two weeks later, it was displaced by Chris Stapleton's album Traveller, which returned to number one having already spent 24 weeks atop the chart since its release in 2015; the album added five weeks to its total in 2017.  In May, Stapleton returned to number one with his next album, From A Room: Volume 1, and in December he achieved his third chart-topper of the year with From A Room: Volume 2.  Stapleton's total of 14 weeks in the top spot was the highest of the year, more than three times the length of time that any other act spent at number one, and From A Room: Volume 1 had the year's longest unbroken run at number one, spending five consecutive weeks atop the listing.  Garth Brooks also achieved more than one chart-topper during the year, as he returned to number one in December with a second compilation album, The Anthology Part I: The First Five Years.

In June, Luke Combs reached number one with his debut album This One's for You, which had spent four non-consecutive weeks in the top spot by the end of the year.  The album would go back to the peak position the following summer after the release of a deluxe edition with additional tracks, and occupy the top spot for much of the next year and a half.  It would eventually achieve a total of 50 weeks atop the listing, tying the record set by Shania Twain's album Come On Over for the highest total number of weeks at number one on the Top Country Albums chart.  Twain herself topped the chart in October with Now, her first studio album for 15 years; the singer had withdrawn from the music industry in the intervening years due to health issues.  RaeLynn matched Combs's feat by topping the chart with her debut album WildHorse,  and Old Dominion, Thomas Rhett. and Jessie James Decker also reached number one for the first time in 2017.  Rhett's album Life Changes was one of two albums to top both the Top Country Albums chart and the all-genre Billboard 200 listing in 2017, the other being Kenny Chesney's Live in No Shoes Nation.

Chart history

See also
2017 in music
List of number-one country singles of 2017 (U.S.)

References

2017
United States Country Albums